Manidens is an extinct genus of heterodontosaurid dinosaur from the Early Jurassic of Patagonia. It is a sister taxon of the closesly related Pegomastax from South Africa. Fossils have been found in the Cañadón Asfalto Formation in Chubut Province, Argentina, dating to the Bajocian.

Etymology 
The type species of Manidens, Manidens condorensis, was described in the journal Naturwissenschaften in 2011. Manidens was named in by Diego Pol, Oliver Rauhut and Marcos Becerra. The generic name is derived from Latin manus, "hand", and dens, "tooth", a reference to the hand-shaped form of the posterior lower teeth. The specific name refers to the village of Cerro Cóndor, located near to the Queso Rallado site where the specimen was found by zoologist Guillermo Rougier.

Description 
The holotype specimen of Manidens, MPEF-PV 3211, consists of a partial skeleton with a skull and lower jaw, including the axial column except most of the tail; a left shoulder girdle; and the pelvis. The specimens MPEF-PV 1719, 1786, 1718, 3810, 3811, isolated posterior teeth, from the same locality and horizon as the holotype specimen are also referred to this genus. The specimens were found in the Queso Rallado locality of the Cañadón Asfalto Formation, dating originally to the Aalenian–Early Bathonian stages, 171 ± 5 to 167 ± 4 Ma, yet where latter constrained to 179-178 million years, that is Middle-Late Toarcian.  

It has high-crowned teeth indicative of an increased adaptation to a herbivorous diet but lacks the wear facets seen in more advanced forms like Heterodontosaurus. Manidens is the sister taxon of a clade consisting of the African species Heterodontosaurus, Abrictosaurus and Lycorhinus, indicating an early radiation of the heterodontosaurids. The discovery of filamentous integumentary structures in the related Tianyulong suggests that they may also have been present in other heterodontosaurids such as Manidens.

Tooth replacement was asynchronous in Manidens, which exhibited dental replacement in a continuous anterior-to-posterior wave pattern. Furthermore, Manidens represents the first known occurrence of a heterodontosaurid with dental replacement of its caniniform teeth, which may have had distinct timing relative to its cheek dentition.

Phylogeny 
Cladogram after Pol et al., 2011:

*Note: Pol et al. regard Echinodon as a genus of Heterodontosauridae.

Paleoecology  
Fossils attributed to Manidens from Argentina indicate that this dinosaur may have been at least partially arboreal. The specimens consists of a series of bones from both hind feet and a few tail vertebrae, and are tentatively attributed to Manidens on the basis of provenance. The long toe bones indicate that the toe bones were capable of grasping; distinct anchor attachments for the muscles and tendons of the hallux indicate that its hallux was smaller than the rest of the toes but could still have grasped. Principal component analysis found that the feet of Manidens were most similar to those of tree-perching birds.

References 

Heterodontosaurids
Ornithischian genera
Middle Jurassic dinosaurs of South America
Jurassic Argentina
Fossils of Argentina
Cañadón Asfalto Formation
Fossil taxa described in 2011